is a Japanese basketball player. She represented Japan in the basketball competition at the 2016 Summer Olympics.

References

1990 births
Living people
Japanese women's basketball players
Basketball players at the 2016 Summer Olympics
Olympic basketball players of Japan
Basketball players at the 2010 Asian Games
Asian Games medalists in basketball
Asian Games bronze medalists for Japan
Small forwards
Medalists at the 2010 Asian Games
21st-century Japanese women